John Hearn may refer to:
John Graham Hearn (b. 1929), a British speed skater
John Hearn (politician) (1827–1894), an Irish-born Canadian merchant and politician in Quebec
John Gabriel Hearn (1863–1927), a Quebec businessman and political figure

See also
John Hearne (disambiguation)